Kevin Robert Evans (born July 10, 1965) is a Canadian former professional ice hockey player who played briefly for the Minnesota North Stars and San Jose Sharks of the NHL.

Biography
Evans was born in Peterborough, Ontario, and is the brother of NHL hockey players Paul Evans and Doug Evans. As a youth, Evans played in the 1978 Quebec International Pee-Wee Hockey Tournament with a minor ice hockey team from Peterborough.

Evans is the all-time leader in penalty minutes for the IHL with 3,083, And until being surpassed by Dennis Bonvie in the 2008 season, he was the career leader in penalty minutes in all of professional hockey, and still holds the single season professional hockey mark of 648, recorded in the 1987 season with the Kalamazoo Wings of the International Hockey League.

Career statistics

References

External links
 

1965 births
Living people
Canadian ice hockey left wingers
Ice hockey people from Ontario
Kalamazoo Wings (1974–2000) players
Kansas City Blades players
Memphis RiverKings players
Minnesota North Stars players
Mississippi Sea Wolves players
Peoria Rivermen (IHL) players
Peterborough Petes (ice hockey) players
San Jose Sharks players
Sportspeople from Peterborough, Ontario
Tupelo T-Rex players
Undrafted National Hockey League players
Victoria Cougars (WHL) players